Arthur Talbot (1892–1960) was a Royal Navy officer.

He commanded the flotilla leader  as Captain (D) of the Third Destroyer Flotilla in 1937–1939 and then commanded three different aircraft carriers from 1940 to 1943.

Citations

Bibliography
 

1892 births
1960 deaths
Royal Navy officers of World War I
Royal Navy officers of World War II